Monologue is a 1972 Soviet drama film directed by Ilya Averbakh. It was entered into the 1973 Cannes Film Festival.

Cast
 Mikhail Gluzsky as Professor Sretensky
 Margarita Terekhova as Tasya, Sretensky's daughter
 Marina Neyolova as Nina, Sretensky's granddaughter
 Stanislav Lyubshin as Konstantin 'Samson' Kotikov
 Yevgeniya Khanayeva  as Elsa Ivanovna (voiced by Irina Gubanova)
 Leonid Gallis as Govornin, curator
 Leonid Nevedomsky as Oleg 
 Valeri Matveyev as Dima
 Ernst Romanov  as Vadim
 Alla Pugacheva vocal (In the performance of Alla Pugacheva, sounds song from the repertoire of Joan Baez "Te Ador" in Portuguese, recorded specially for the film during the time work singer's in the jazz orchestra under the guidance of Oleg Lundstrem).

References

External links

1972 films
1972 drama films
Soviet drama films
Russian drama films
1970s Russian-language films
Films directed by Ilya Averbakh
1970s psychological drama films